New Buffalo is a borough in Perry County, Pennsylvania, United States. The population was 124 at the time of the 2020 census.

It is part of the Harrisburg metropolitan area.

Geography
New Buffalo is located at  (40.454175, -76.969914).

According to the United States Census Bureau, the borough has a total area of 0.1 square mile (0.2 km2), all of it land.

Demographics

As of the census of 2000, there were 123 people, 57 households, and 36 families residing in the borough.

The racial makeup of the borough was 95.12% White, 2.44% African American, 0.81% Asian, and 1.63% from two or more races.

There were 57 households, out of which 19.3% had children under the age of eighteen living with them; 40.4% were married couples living together, 15.8% had a female householder with no husband present, and 36.8% were non-families. 33.3% of all households were made up of individuals, and 12.3% had someone living alone who was sixty-five years of age or older.

The average household size was 2.16 and the average family size was 2.72.

In the borough the population was spread out, with 17.9% under the age of eighteen, 8.9% from eighteen to twenty-four, 22.0% from twenty-five to forty-four, 38.2% from forty-five to sixty-four, and 13.0% who were sixty-five years of age or older. The median age was forty-six years.

For every one hundred females, there were 92.2 males. For every one hundred females aged eighteen and over, there were 98.0 males.

The median income for a household in the borough was $31,250, and the median income for a family was $28,750. Males had a median income of $31,250 compared with that of $23,750 for females.

The per capita income for the borough was $17,276. There were 20.6% of families and 22.0% of the population living below the poverty line, including 50.0% of those who were under the age of eighteen. None of those were over the age of sixty-four.

References

Populated places established in 1800
Pennsylvania populated places on the Susquehanna River
Harrisburg–Carlisle metropolitan statistical area
Boroughs in Perry County, Pennsylvania
1848 establishments in Pennsylvania